Army General Yevgeni F. Ivanovski (March 7, 1918 – September 22, 1991) served in numerous high commands following the Second World War, including the command of the Moscow Military District from 1968 to 1972, command of the Group of Soviet Forces in Germany from 20. July 1972 to 25. November 1980. Nationality - Belarus.

On 3 November 1972, following the decision of the Supreme Soviet of the USSR, he was promoted to the rank of the Army General. His next command was  Belorussian Military District from December 1980 to February 1985, when he was promoted to the position of the Commander in Chief of the Soviet Ground Forces. In 1989 he became the member of the inspectorate of the Ministry of the Defense of the USSR.

In the years 1971–1989 he was a member of the Central Committee of the Communist Party of the Soviet Union. He also served 3 terms as a deputy in the Supreme Soviet of the USSR.

Yevgeni F. Ivanovski spent his last years living in Moscow, where he died on  22 September 1991. He was buried at Novodevichy Cemetery.

He has published a memoir.

Sources and references

1918 births
1991 deaths
People from Chashniki District
Central Committee of the Communist Party of the Soviet Union members
Eighth convocation members of the Soviet of the Union
Ninth convocation members of the Soviet of the Union
Tenth convocation members of the Soviet of the Union
Eleventh convocation members of the Soviet of Nationalities
Army generals (Soviet Union)
People of the Soviet invasion of Poland
Soviet military personnel of the Winter War
Soviet military personnel of World War II
Heroes of the Soviet Union
Recipients of the Order of Lenin
Recipients of the Order of the Red Banner
Recipients of the Order of Kutuzov, 1st class
Recipients of the Order of Suvorov, 3rd class
Recipients of the Scharnhorst Order
Commanders of the Order of Polonia Restituta
Commanders of the Order of Merit of the Republic of Poland
Recipients of the Cross of Valour (Poland)
Burials at Novodevichy Cemetery
Military Academy of the General Staff of the Armed Forces of the Soviet Union alumni